General elections were held in Sikkim in 1958. The Sikkim State Congress emerged as the largest party, winning seven of the 20 seats. Voter turnout was around 35%.

Electoral system
The State Council was established in 1953 by the Chogyal. It originally had 18 members, of which 12 were elected and six (including the President) appointed by the Chogyal. Of the 12 elected members, six were for the Nepali community and six for the Lepcha and the Bhutia communities. For the 1958 elections the number of seats was increased to 20. One seat for the Sangha was added, together with an unreserved seat.

Candidates for election to the Council had to be at least 30 years old, whilst the voting age was set at 21. Around 55,000 voters registered for the election.

Results

Constituency-wise

Appointed members
In addition to the elected members, six others were appointed to the Sikkim State Council by the Chogyal, on 15 March; Rai Bahadur Densapa, Rev. Chotuk Tsering Pazo, Indra Prasad Subba, Bhairap Bahadur Lamchaney, Atal Singh Dewan and Hon Lt Prem Bahadur Basnet.

Executive Council
The Executive Council was chosen from among the elected members, in addition to the Dewan of Sikkim, who was its President:

References

Elections in Sikkim
Sikkim
1950s in Sikkim
Election and referendum articles with incomplete results